Andrzej Włast (aka Gustaw Baumritter) (17 March 1885 – 1942 or 1943) was a Polish Jewish songwriter.  He wrote the lyrics for the 1929 hit song "Tango Milonga" / "Oh, Donna Clara".  He died in the Warsaw Ghetto during World War II.

Biography
Włast was born in Łódź.  He studied law at Warsaw University. He began writing for the Warsaw stage before 1920 at Mirage, Czarny Kot, Sfinks and others.  When the Bolshevik army attacked Poland in 1920 he fought to defend Warsaw against the Red Army in Pilsudski's Legion.

After 1921 he worked with the Stańczyk (The Jester) theater and then the famous Qui Pro Quo.  In 1927 he founded his own revue, the Morskie Oko theater, which he managed until 1931.  Later on, he managed the Rex revue and Wielka Rewia (The Grand Revue), each considered to be Polish versions of the Folies-Bergère.

He was a prolific lyricist, sometimes called "The King of 'szmira' (cheap mass production of very low quality)" but there were
"also pearls of pure poetry, as well as innumerable examples of sophisticated Jewish humor and gems of szmonces (shmontses), Polish Jewish self-mockery, albeit resting upon many stereotypes."

He wrote Polish lyrics to Jerzy Petersburski's 1929 international hit Tango Milonga, better known internationally as "Oh, Donna Clara". Bob Rothstein writes:

"One of the most successful of the Polish Jewish composers was Jerzy Petersburski (born Jerzy Melodysta, 1897–1979), whose 1929 hit Tango Milonga, renamed Oh, Donna Clara, swept Europe ... and the United States ... sung by Al Jolson in the 1931 Broadway show The Wonder Bar. ... The original Polish text of Tango Milonga was written by Andrzej Włast (born Gustaw Baumritter, 1885–1941), one of the best-known lyricists of the interwar period, who wrote other hit tunes with melodies by Petersburski [such as] Już nigdy (Never Again) and Ja się boję sama spać (I’m Afraid to Sleep Alone), and by other Jewish composers, such as Henryk Gold (1899–1977; Szkoda twoich łez (Don’t Waste Your Tears)), Artur Gold (1897–1943; Przy kominku (By the Fireplace)), Zygmunt Białostocki (1897–1942; Rebeka), and Fanny Gordon (pen name of Fania Markovna Kviatkovskaia, 1904–1991; Pod samowarem (By the Samovar))."

After the 1939 German invasion of Poland, Włast was ordered in 1940 to live in the German-ordered Warsaw Ghetto. Some say that he was dragged out, like thousands of others, during a 1942 German action, to the Umschlagplatz and transported to Treblinka German death camp.  Others say:

...that he hid on the so-called "Aryan" side, in a flat of one of [the] Polish actresses he knew from his theatre. Being unable to stay most of the time alone in that microscopic shelter, and panicking at the slightest sign of the approaching steps, he finally ran out to the street, where he was immediately identified as a Jew and shot by a German soldier.

References 

1885 births
1940s deaths
Jewish songwriters
Polish songwriters
Writers from Łódź
People who died in the Warsaw Ghetto
Polish civilians killed in World War II